Lieutenant Colonel George Barney (19 May 1792 – 16 April 1862) was a military engineer of the Corps of Royal Engineers and became Lieutenant Governor of the Colony of North Australia.

Early life
George Barney was born in Wolverhampton, Staffordshire, England, the son of Joseph Barney, drawing master at the Royal Military Academy, Woolwich, England, and Jane, née Chandler (or Chambers). He entered the army at 16 as second lieutenant in the Royal Engineers. He served in the Peninsular War and for many years in the West Indies. He had several years experience of civil engineering in Jamaica. He was promoted to captain in 1825.

Career in Australia
In July 1834, New South Wales Governor Richard Bourke asked that a civil engineer should be sent to Sydney to take charge of the construction of a large circular quay at Sydney Cove and other public works. From 1835 a number of Royal Engineer officers with a detachment of the Corps of Royal Sappers and Miners were sent out to New South Wales and Van Diemen's Land, Australia. Captain George Barney, Commanding Royal Engineer of New South Wales, arrived at Sydney on the British Sovereign with his wife and three children on 15 December 1835, with instructions that he was also to take charge of and superintend the buildings belonging to the military, and convict departments. He was followed in by Lieutenant Henry Williamson Lugard, RE, on the Hive and Tamar on 16 December, and their Clerk of Works, George Graham, and his family in 1836.

Bourke stated in February 1836 that Barney was engaged in removing obstructions to the navigation of the Parramatta River, and asked that leave might be granted him to undertake the duty of colonial engineer at a salary of £500 a year plus travelling charges. This was granted in September 1837, and in 1838 Barney brought forward a scheme for the sale of the barracks in Sydney, as the land was now valuable; the proceeds to be used for new buildings at Sydney and Newcastle, New South Wales. In 1839 he prepared a report on the defence of the harbours in the colony and made various recommendations. The English authorities, however, declined to consider the question until they had received plans and estimates of the proposed work. Governor George Gipps supported Barney and with the aid of convict labour the preparing of the ground for the guns was begun in 1840. In January 1843 Gipps spoke very highly of Barney, but stated he had so many other duties it was scarcely possible for him to give the required attention to his colonial appointment. Barney was appointed a member of the New South Wales Legislative Council from 17 July 1843, but resigned in August 1843.

Barney returned to England in May 1844 and served at Woolwich. In May 1846, now a lieutenant-colonel, was appointed Lieutenant-Governor of North Australia. In 1822 John Bigge had recommended the establishment of a convict settlement at Port Curtis on the east coast of Queensland. The project had been revived several times, and as some difficulty was being experienced in finding work for time-expired convicts in Tasmania, it was now decided to try the experiment of sending them to a new area and giving them land and a certain amount of government help. Edward Smith-Stanley, 14th Earl of Derby and William Ewart Gladstone, successive secretaries of state for the colonies, had fathered the project, and Gladstone had selected Barney as a man used to authority and with previous experience in Australia.

Barney arrived again in Sydney on 15 September 1846 in the William Hyde, and quickly surveyed the coast in a small steamer, and decided that Port Curtis was the most suitable place for a settlement. Returning to Sydney a barque, the Lord Auckland, was chartered, and on 8 January 1847 sailed with Barney and his family, various officials, and a small military force. The party arrived at an unfavourable period and there was much discomfort from the extreme heat. In the meantime there had been a change of ministries in England, Henry Grey, 3rd Earl Grey had succeeded Gladstone, and had promptly vetoed the whole project. News of this reached Barney on 15 April 1847 and the party returned to Sydney. Barney was criticised in some quarters, but the colony was never given a chance to succeed. In later years the thriving town of Gladstone, Queensland, was established on the site, and the harbour is one of the finest in Australia.

Late life
Barney was appointed successively chief commissioner of crown lands on 1 January 1849, and Surveyor General of New South Wales on 11 October 1855. He was again appointed a member of the Legislative Council from 13 October 1851 to 29 February 1856.

He died at Sydney on 16 April 1862 and was buried in St Thomas's cemetery (now St Thomas Rest Park). He was survived by his wife, Portia Henrietta Peale.

Legacy

Barney's North Sydney house, Wotonga, was later acquired by the Commonwealth and, after extensions, became Admiralty House, the Sydney residence of the Governor-General of Australia.

There is a monument to George Barney in The Rocks, Sydney.

Mount Barney in the Scenic Rim Region of Queensland is named after him.

The suburb of Barney Point in Gladstone, Queensland is named after him.

References

Further reading

Additional sources listed by the Australian Dictionary of Biography:
 Historical Records of Australia, Series I, vols 17–22, 25, 26
 
 
 
 
 [CC-By-SA]
 

1792 births
1862 deaths
Military personnel from Staffordshire
Burials in New South Wales
People from Wolverhampton
Royal Engineers officers
British civil engineers
Surveyors General of New South Wales
Australian surveyors
Members of the New South Wales Legislative Council
19th-century Australian politicians
English emigrants to colonial Australia